The 2022–23 Cymru South season (also known as the 2022–23 JD Cymru South season for sponsorship reasons) is the fourth season of the second-tier Southern region football in Welsh football pyramid. Teams play each other twice on a home and away basis.

Llantwit Major are the defending champions from the 2021-22 season, but as they were denied a Tier 1 license, they remained in the league and Pontypridd Town were promoted in their place.

Barry Town returned to the second tier after their five-year spell in the top flight, following their relegation from the 2021-22 Cymru Premier. Pontardawe Town and Abergavenny Town were both promoted as champions of the Ardal SW and Ardal SE respectively. Ynyshir Albions were also promoted from the SW league, after defeating Abertillery Bluebirds 3–0 in the play-off final.

Teams
The league consisted of 16 clubs.

Team Changes

To Cymru South
Promoted from Ardal SE
 Abergavenny Town

Promoted from Ardal SW
 Pontardawe Town
 Ynyshir Albions

Relegated from Cymru Premier
 Barry Town United

From Cymru South
Promoted to Cymru Premier
 Pontypridd Town

Relegated to Ardal SE
 Risca United
 Undy Athletic

Relegated to Ardal SW
 Port Talbot Town

Stadia and Locations

Managerial changes

League table

Results

References 

2022–23 in Welsh football
Cymru South seasons
Wales
Current association football seasons